"Been It" is a song by Swedish band the Cardigans, released from their third studio album, First Band on the Moon. In additional to reaching number 26 on the UK Singles Chart, the song also became an alternative hit in Canada, climbing to number nine on the RPM Alternative 30.

Formats and track listings
All songs were written by Nina Persson and Peter Svensson.

 German CD single 
 "Been It"  – 3:41
 "Blah Blah Blah" – 2:58

 European, UK, and Australia CD single 
 "Been It"  – 3:41
 "Been It"  – 3:40
 "Blah Blah Blah" – 2:58
 "Losers"  – 3:15

 UK limited-edition 7-inch single 
A. "Been It"  – 3:41
B. "Been It"  – 3:40

 US 12-inch single 
 "Been It"  – 6:59
 "Been It"  – 6:15
 "Lovefool"  – 7:56
 "Lovefool"  – 7:10

 Canadian and US CD single 
 "Been It"  – 6:59
 "Been It"  – 6:16
 "Been It"  – 4:06
 "Lovefool"  – 7:58
 "Lovefool"  – 7:10

Credits and personnel
Credits are adapted from the liner notes of First Band on the Moon.

Musicians
 Nina Persson – lead vocals
 Peter Svensson – guitar
 Magnus Sveningsson – bass
 Lars-Olof Johansson – keyboards
 Bengt Lagerberg – drums and percussion

Technical personnel
 Tore Johansson – engineering and production
 Roger Jonsson – mastering

Charts

Release history

References

The Cardigans songs
1996 singles
1996 songs
Mercury Records singles
Songs written by Nina Persson
Songs written by Peter Svensson
Stockholm Records singles